Enoch Dumbutshena (20 April 1920 – 14 December 2000) was a distinguished Zimbabwean judge known for defending the independence of that country's judicial branch. He became Zimbabwe's first black judge in 1980 and served as Chief Justice of Zimbabwe from 1984 to 1990. Dumbutshena's decisions were often highly critical of President Robert Mugabe and his government. A former member of the International Commission of Jurists, he unsuccessfully attempted to launch a political career of his own in 1993 by founding the free-market Forum Party. He died in late 2000 of liver cancer.

Character 
Lord Denning described Dumbutshena J as "a much-respected figure, courageous and independent as a judge should be." He was a member of the African National Congress, and was refused a passport to travel to the US “due to prevailing conditions” in 1959. [Source: “African Journalist Refused Passport to America,” Contact, 18 April 1959.]

Legal career 
Dumbutshena was Zimbabwe's first black High Court Judge. He famously acquitted a group of six white Zimbabwe Air Force officers who had been tortured into confessing to participation in the sabotage of fighter aircraft.

References 

"Judge Enoch Dumbutshena dies." The Washington Post 16 Dec. 2000: B.08.

1920 births
2000 deaths
20th-century Zimbabwean judges
Chief justices of Zimbabwe
Deaths from cancer in Zimbabwe
Deaths from liver cancer
Judges of the Supreme Court of Zimbabwe